Laragh is a townland of 132 acres in County Fermanagh, Northern Ireland. It is situated in the civil parish of Trory and the historic barony of Tirkennedy. It is near Enniskillen Airport.

Laragh is the base for Balcas Timber Ltd, a major employer in Fermanagh, producing timber products and wood pellets as a renewable energy fuel. The company is a major supplier of wood pellets to the United Kingdom.

There are two other townlands in County Fermanagh with the same name: Laragh (Rossory) and Laragh (Kinawley).

References

Townlands of County Fermanagh
Civil parish of Trory